The 2017 Tim Hortons Brier, Canada's national men's curling championship, was held from March 4–12, 2017 at the Mile One Centre in St. John's, Newfoundland and Labrador.

This marked the second time the Brier was hosted by St. John's, the first being the 1972 Macdonald Brier.

Newfoundland and Labrador won the Brier 7–6 in the final against Team Canada, giving skip Brad Gushue his first Brier title. With the win, the Gushue rink earned the right to represent Canada at the 2017 Ford World Men's Curling Championship held from April 1–9, 2017 at Northlands Coliseum in Edmonton, Alberta. They also represented Team Canada at the 2018 Tim Hortons Brier in Regina, Saskatchewan and earned $225,000 for the victory. The bronze medal was won by Manitoba.

The total attendance for the event was 122,592, up from the 115,047 that attended the previous year's Brier held in Ottawa, Ontario. The attendance for the final was 6,471.

Background

Host bidding
Both Ontario's Sault Ste. Marie (Essar Centre) and Newfoundland and Labrador's St. John's (Mile One Centre) made bids for the Brier, but it was announced on September 14, 2015 that St. John's would host.

Brier Bear
The wearer of the Brier Bear – the Brier-renowned mascot – suit, Reg Caughie, announced that, after this 2017 Canadian Men's Curling Championship, he would retire from wearing the suit. The 78-year old Caughie believed that Curling Canada would continue the tradition of the Brier Bear.

Teams
Ten of the fifteen teams of the 2017 Brier were in the top 30 of the men's 2016–17 CTRS standings. Newfoundland and Labrador's Brad Gushue, skip of one of the consistent top three rinks in Canada, attempted to win his first Brier (in 14 appearances) in front of a hometown crowd. Brothers Kevin Koe – representing Team Canada, and Jamie Koe – representing the Northwest Territories, again competed against each other. 2016 PEI Champion Adam Casey and his third David Mathers moved west to join rinks that then won the championships of Saskatchewan and Ontario, respectively.

Glenn Howard won the Ontario Championship for the 17th time as either third or skip. By contrast, a team not skipped by either Kevin Martin, Randy Ferbey or Kevin Koe won the Alberta Championship for the first time since 1999 (although Kevin Martin coached Alberta's Brendan Bottcher).

The teams are listed as follows:

CTRS ranking

Pre-qualifying tournament

Standings

Results
All draw times are listed in Newfoundland Standard Time (UTC−03:30).

Draw 1
Thursday, March 2, 7:00 pm

Draw 2
Friday, March 3, 8:00 am

Draw 3
Friday, March 3, 3:30 pm

Pre-qualifying final
Saturday, March 4, 3:00 pm

Round-robin standings
Final round-robin standings

Round-robin results
All draw times are listed in Newfoundland Standard Time (UTC−03:30).

Draw 1
Saturday, March 4, 3:00 pm

Draw 2
Saturday, March 4, 8:00 pm

Draw 3
Sunday, March 5, 10:00 am

Draw 4
Sunday, March 5, 3:00 pm

Draw 5
Sunday, March 5, 8:00 pm

Draw 6
Monday, March 6, 3:00 pm

Draw 7
Monday, March 6, 8:00 pm

Draw 8
Tuesday, March 7, 10:00 am

Draw 9
Tuesday, March 7, 3:00 pm

Draw 10
Tuesday, March 7, 8:00 pm

Draw 11
Wednesday, March 8, 10:00 am

Draw 12
Wednesday, March 8, 3:00 pm

Draw 13
Wednesday, March 8, 8:00 pm

Draw 14
Thursday, March 9, 10:00 am

Draw 15
Thursday, March 9, 3:00 pm

Draw 16
Thursday, March 9, 8:00 pm

Draw 17
Friday, March 10, 10:00 am

Playoffs

1 vs. 2
Friday, March 10, 8:00 pm

3 vs. 4
Saturday, March 11, 3:00 pm

Semifinal
Saturday, March 11, 8:30 pm

Bronze medal game
Sunday, March 12, 3:00 pm

Final
Sunday, March 12, 8:00 pm

Statistics

Player percentages
Round Robin only

Perfect games
Round Robin only

Awards
The awards and all-star teams are listed as follows:

All-Star Teams
First Team
Skip:  Brad Gushue, Newfoundland and Labrador
Third:  Catlin Schneider, Saskatchewan
Second:  E.J. Harnden, Northern Ontario
Lead:  Denni Neufeld, Manitoba

Second Team
Skip:  Mike McEwen, Manitoba
Third:  Mark Nichols, Newfoundland and Labrador
Second:  Matt Wozniak, Manitoba
Lead:  Geoff Walker, Newfoundland and Labrador

Ross Harstone Sportsmanship Award
 Jean-Michel Ménard, Quebec Skip

Paul McLean Award
Leigh Buttery, TSN

Hec Gervais Most Valuable Player Award
 Brad Gushue, Newfoundland and Labrador Skip

Notes

References

 
2017 in Canadian curling
The Brier
Sport in St. John's, Newfoundland and Labrador
2017 in Newfoundland and Labrador
Curling in Newfoundland and Labrador
Tim Hortons Brier